Zhao Zuojun (Pinyin: Zhào Zuòjùn; born 16 October 1983) is a Chinese footballer, who currently plays as a defender.

Club career
Zhao Zuojun was a graduate of the Shanghai COSCO Huili youth team before moving to the senior team in the 2002 league season. Under the team's Head coach Claude Le Roy, Zhao was given his chance to establish himself in the 2003 league season and despite Cheng Yaodong coming in as Claude Le Roy's replacement during the season Zhao would still establish himself as part of the team that saw the club just miss out in the league title to Shanghai Shenhua by a single point. Zhao continued to develop as a defender for the team and remained loyal to the club even when they decided to move to Shaanxi and rename themselves. After becoming a vital member within the team Zhao left the club in 2009 to join second tier club Nanchang Bayi where he was re-teamed with Zhu Jiong who was a former assistant coach at Zhao's previous club. The move turned out to be a successful one when Nanchang came second in the division and promotion to the top tier.

In January 2015, Zhao transferred to China League One side Nei Mongol Zhongyou.
On 13 January 2016, Zhao returned to Shanghai Shenxin.

Club career statistics
Statistics accurate as of match played 3 November 2018.

References

External links
Player stats at sohu.com
 

1983 births
Living people
Chinese footballers
Footballers from Shanghai
Beijing Renhe F.C. players
Shanghai Shenxin F.C. players
Inner Mongolia Zhongyou F.C. players
Chinese Super League players
China League One players
Association football defenders
21st-century Chinese people